Mineman (abbreviated as MN) is a  United States Navy occupational rating.

Duties
 Perform organizational and intermediate level maintenance on underwater mines and associated equipment, guns, gun mounts, handling equipment, small arms, surface sonar and mine countermeasures equipment.
 Assemble, test, stow, and transport underwater mines.
 Operate, maintain, and perform authorized modifications on material handling equipment, assembly‑level items, and test equipment.
 Perform safety criteria testing on material handling equipment.
 Participate in fleet mining and exercise training programs.
 Train, direct, and supervise personnel in ship's maintenance duties in all activities relating to marlinespike, deck, boat seamanship, painting, maintenance, upkeep of ship's external structure, rigging, deck equipment, and boats.
 Perform seamanship tasks; test and inspect gun ammunition.
 Inspect and repair magazine sprinkler systems.
 Supervise personnel in handling and stowage of gun ammunition.
 Direct crews in operation of guns, gun mounts, ammunition hoists, and handling rooms.
 Function as Plotters and Radiotelephone talkers.
 Maintain Combat Information Center (CIC) displays of strategic and tactical information.
 Operate surveillance radar, Identification Friend or Foe (IFF) Systems, and associated equipment
 Interpret radar presentations, evaluate tactical situations, and make recommendations to superiors during watch conditions.
 Apply current doctrine and procedures to CIC operations as necessary for radar navigation.
 Provide technical information and assistance related to Mine Warfare and search and rescue operations.
 Provide technical information and advice on capabilities, limitations, reliability, and operational readiness.
 Advise staffs and commands on matters of operations and personnel.
 Operate (manipulate, control, evaluate, and interpret data) surface sonar and other oceanographic systems.

Requirements
ASVAB Score Requirement: VE + AR + MK + MC = 210 or VE + AR + MK + AS = 210

Security Clearance Requirement: Secret

Other Requirements:

Must have normal color perception
Must be a U.S. Citizen

References

See also
List of United States Navy ratings

United States Navy ratings